The Zuytdorp Cliffs extend for about  along a rugged, spectacular and little visited segment of the Western Australian Indian Ocean coast. The cliffs extend from just south of the mouth of the Murchison River at Kalbarri, to Pepper Point south of Steep Point. The cliffs are situated in both the Gascoyne and Mid West regions of the state.

They are named after a trading ship of the Dutch East India Company, the Zuytdorp, that was wrecked against the cliffs in 1712.

Geology
The Zuytdorp Cliffs are composed of Pleistocene aged limestone, a formation called the Tamala Limestone. This limestone formed by the cementation of ancient calcareous sand dunes that accumulated near the coast during episodes of the last ice age. It has been inferred that the relatively straight edge of the cliffs is due to a major fault line just off shore.

References

Further reading
 Hocking R.M., van der Graaff W.J.E., Blockley J.G., Butcher B.P. 1982. Ajana, Western Australia, 1:250,000 Geological Map Series, SG50-13, Explanatory Notes, Geological Survey of Western Australia. GSWA download search

Shark Bay
Cliffs of Australia